Events in the year 1685 in Japan.

Incumbents
Monarch: Reigen

Deaths
March 22 - Emperor Go-Sai (b. 1638)

References 

 
1680s in Japan
Japan
Years of the 17th century in Japan